The  was a Japanese fleet oiler, serving during World War II. Four vessels were planned under the Maru Sen Programme; however, only one vessel was completed by the end of war.

Construction
The Hario-class oilers were planned instead of the cancelled Kazahaya class oilers.  The Navy Technical Department (Kampon) armed these vessels as a Type 1TL wartime standard ship.

Service
The Hario was completed and assigned to the Combined Fleet on 1 December 1944, joining the Hi-89 convoy from Moji to Singapore on 24 January 1945.  She arrived in Singapore on 9 February 1945, joining the Hi-94 convoy (returning to Moji from Singapore) on 23 February 1945. On 1 March, she arrived at a relay point at Yulin, Hainan. Two days later, on 3 March, she left Yulin, only to hit a mine and sink the same day. She was decommissioned 10 May.

Ships in class

Footnotes

References
Ships of the World special issue Vol.47, Auxiliary Vessels of the Imperial Japanese Navy, (Japan), March 1997
Shinshichirō Komamiya, The Wartime Convoy Histories, (Japan), October 1987, 

World War II naval ships of Japan
World War II tankers
Ships sunk by mines
1944 ships
Oilers
Ships built by Hitachi Zosen Corporation